DJ-Kicks: Stereo MC's is a DJ mix album, mixed by Stereo MC's. It was released on  27 March 2000 on the Studio !K7 independent record label as part of the DJ-Kicks series.

Track listing
"Moon Trek" - The Mike Theodore Orchestra  – 3:03
"Back to the Hip Hop" (instrumental) - The Troubleneck Brothers  – 2:02
"Solid Feet" - Kitty Bronx  – 4:13
"Ibuki Reconstruction" - Kodo  – 4:06
"Road to the Riches" - Kool G Rap & DJ Polo  – 2:30
"Tell Me Why" (Revised by Soul Circuit) - Freakniks  – 1:52
"Poppa Large" - Ultramagnetic MCs  – 1:28
"Do It, Do It" - Disco Four  – 2:35
"Beans & Rice" - Sofa Surfers  – 4:07
"Tongue of Labyrinth" - Divine Styler  – 0:51
"Roller Rinks and Chicks" - Freddy Fresh  – 1:00
"From the Ground Up" (A cappella) - The Associates  – 1:36
"Slight of Hand" - Oil  – 3:26
"Rhino Part II" - Stereo MC's  – 4:49
"Pharaoh Intellect" - The 57th Dynasty  – 3:23
"Flameout" - 101 Strings  – 2:31
"Theme from Control Centre" (Reprise) - The Herbaliser  – 2:43
"Hypnotize" - Mark Stewart  – 0:19
"Latazz" - The Funky Lowlives  – 2:25
"At the Helm" - Hieroglyphics  – 2:36
"Rhino Part III" - Stereo MC's  – 3:17
"Seeing Red" - Red Snapper  – 3:51
"Rhino Part I" - Stereo MC's  – 4:11
"Front Line Football" - Frontline  – 1:05
"Cash Flow" - Scaramanga  – 1:41

References

External links 
DJ-Kicks website

Stereo MC's
Stereo MCs albums
2000 compilation albums